Right Boy (1954–1977) was an Irish-bred, British-trained Thoroughbred racehorse and sire

Background
Right Boy cost 575 guineas as a yearling. He was the second top sprinter of the 1950s to be trained in Yorkshire by Bill Dutton - the first was Pappa Fourway, who cost even less. When Dutton died in 1958, the horse was taken over by his late trainer's son-in-law Pat Rohan.

Racing career
As a two-year-old won his first four races against moderate opposition but was then unplaced behind Eudaemon in the Gimcrack Stakes. As a three-year-old he developed into a top-class sprinter, winning the King's Stand Stakes at Royal Ascot and finishing second in the Nunthorpe Stakes at York.

In 1958 he won six consecutive races including the Cork and Orrery Stakes, July Cup, King George Stakes and Nunthorpe Stakes.

In his final season, Right Boy recorded repeat wins in the Cork & Orrery Stakes, July Cup, King George Stakes and Nunthorpe Stakes. He ended his racing career by finishing second, when attempting to concede thirty-two pounds to the winner in the Portland Handicap at Doncaster.

Stud record
At stud, the only notable winners he produced by the time he was put down in 1977 were Reet Lass, who won the Molecomb Stakes at Goodwood, and Village Boy, who landed the Richmond Stakes at the same course.

Pedigree

References

 The Complete Encyclopedia of Horse Racing - written by Bill Mooney and George Ennor

1954 racehorse births
1977 racehorse deaths
Racehorses bred in the United Kingdom
Racehorses trained in the United Kingdom
Thoroughbred family 1-g